Simone Robertson (28 May 1975 in Melbourne, Australia) is an Australian actress best known for her 1991–1993 role as Phoebe Gottlieb in the TV series Neighbours. Her sister is Aimee Robertson. She is also a trained jazz and tap dancer.
Simone previously dated her co-star Benjamin Mitchell who played Cameron Hudson. She is now married to Jean-Marc Russ who played Boris in the Australian Soap Opera 'Breakers', and now lives in New York City.

Filmography
 Father (1990).... Rebecca Winton
  Pugwall's Summer (1991).... Rochelle
 Neighbours (1991–1993) 64 Episodes.... Phoebe Gottlieb
 Breakers (1998).... Monique Fairbairn
 Water Rats (2000) 1 Episode.... Andrea Tell
 The Lost World (2001) 1 Episode.... Empress Centuria
 Home and Away (2001) 3 Episodes.... Desiree Upton
 Corridors of Power (2001) 1 Episode.... Annika
 Head Start (2001) 1 Episode.... Abby
 All Saints (2001) 1 Episode.... Bridget Farrier

External links

References

1975 births
Living people
Actresses from Melbourne
Australian soap opera actresses